"You'll Lose a Good Thing" is a popular song written by rhythm and blues artist Barbara Lynn Ozen, who, performing as Barbara Lynn, scored a 1962 Top 10 hit, peaking at #8 and also the number 1 spot on the R&B charts, with her bluesy rendition of the song.

Cover versions
Freddy Fender retained those bluesy, soulful elements when he recorded a country version of the song in 1975. In April 1976, the song was his fourth No. 1 song on the Billboard magazine Hot Country Singles chart.

 Many other versions of the song have been recorded over the years by artists including Aretha Franklin, Carla Thomas, Denise LaSalle, Dina Carroll, McAlmont & Butler and Lucinda Williams.

Use in media
Barbara Lynn's recording is featured in the film Hairspray.

Charts

Barbara Lynn

Freddy Fender

Year-end charts

References

1962 singles
1976 singles
1976 songs
Freddy Fender songs
Songs written by Huey P. Meaux
Song recordings produced by Huey P. Meaux
1962 songs
Songs written by Barbara Lynn
Madness (band) songs